The 2011 Campeonato Roraimense was the 17th season of Roraima's top professional football league. The competition began 2 April and ended 21 May. Baré was the defending champion, but did not participate due to financial issues.

Format
Six clubs were divided into two groups that played in two tournaments. In both tournaments the teams played a single round robin. The group winners qualified for the final. The winner of both tournaments played for the state championship. If the same team had won both tournaments, they would have been automatically declared the champion.

Qualifications
The champion qualified for 2012 Copa do Brasil and 2011 Campeonato Brasileiro Série D

Participating teams

All games expect Rio Negro vs Náutico were played in Ribeirão, Boa Vista

First tournament

Group stage

Group A standings

Real qualified due to having less red cards than Atlético Roraima (0-2).

Group B standings

Final stage

Second tournament

Real won both stages.

Overall standings

References

2011 Roraima on www.rsssfbrasil.com

External links
 http://www.futeboldonorte.com/ 

Ror
Campeonato Roraimense